County Westmeath (or simply ) is a county in Ireland. It is in the province of Leinster and is part of the Eastern and Midland Region. It formed part of the historic Kingdom of Meath, which was named Mide because the kingdom was located in the geographical centre of Ireland (the word Mide meaning 'middle'). Westmeath County Council is the administrative body for the county, and the county town is Mullingar. At the 2022 census, the population of the county was 95,840.

History 
Following the Norman invasion of Ireland, the territory of the Gaelic Kingdom of Meath formed the basis for the Anglo-Norman Lordship of Meath granted by King Henry II of England to Hugh de Lacy in 1172. Following the failure of de Lacy's male heirs in 1241, the Lordship was split between two great-granddaughters. One moiety, a central eastern portion, was awarded to Maud (de Geneville) as the liberty of Trim; the other moiety, comprising north-eastern and western portions, went to Maud's sister Margery (de Verdun) and in 1297 became the royal county of Meath. The liberty and royal county were merged in 1461. While the east of the county was in the English Pale, the west was Gaelicised in the fourteenth century and outside the control of the sheriff of Meath.

As a part of the better administration of the newly established Kingdom of Ireland, the Parliament of Ireland passed the Counties of Meath and Westmeath Act 1543, the eastern portion retaining the name Meath and the western portion called Westmeath.

Geography and subdivisions 

Westmeath is the 20th largest of Ireland's 32 counties by area and the 22nd largest in terms of population. It is the sixth largest of Leinster's 12 counties in size and eighth largest in terms of population. The Hill of Uisneach in the barony of Moycashel is sometimes regarded as the notional geographical centre of Ireland although the actual geographic centre of Ireland lies in neighbouring County Roscommon. The summit of Mullaghmeen is the highest point in County Westmeath. At just 258 metres this makes it the lowest county top in Ireland.

Local government and politics
The head office of Westmeath County Council is located in Mullingar. There are currently 20 councillors. The three local electoral areas of Westmeath are Athlone (7 seats), Mullingar–Coole (7 seats) and Mullingar–Kilbeggan (6 seats). The Local Government (Ireland) Act 1898 provided the framework for the establishment of County Councils throughout Ireland. The first meeting of Westmeath County Council was held on 22 April 1899.

Westmeath's population growth has been stronger than the national average. After the Great Famine, the population of Westmeath declined dramatically. It stabilised in the middle of the 20th century, and has continued to grow. Westmeath's proximity to Dublin, with good motorway facilities and frequent rail service, has made commuting popular.

County Westmeath's population fell in the century following the Great Famine, with many leaving for better opportunities in America.
The largest town in the county is Athlone, followed by the County town Mullingar. Westmeath is the largest county by population in the Irish Midlands. Important commercial and marketing centres include Moate, Kilbeggan, Kinnegad, Ballinahown, Delvin, Rochfortbridge, Killucan and Castlepollard. According to the 2011 census, 51.9% of Westmeath households have at least one member reporting an ability in Irish.

Westmeath is one of the few counties in Ireland where some census records from 1841 are still available. Some of the records of that census have been digitised and maintained by the National Archives of Ireland.

As of the 2022 census, Westmeath had a population of 95,840, consisting of  47,522  males and 48,318 females. The Central Statistics Office also said that despite the overall increase in population, the rural population had still fallen (2016 census).

Economy

Initially, development occurred around the major market centres of Mullingar, Moate, and Kinnegad. Athlone developed due to its military significance, and its strategic location on the main Dublin–Galway route across the River Shannon. Mullingar gained considerable advantage from the development of the Royal Canal. The canal facilitated cheap transport of produce to Dublin, Britain and Europe. Athlone and Mullingar expanded further with the coming of the Midland Great Western Railway network in the nineteenth century.

Tourism in Westmeath is generally based on its many water amenities. The county lakes include Lough Derravaragh, Lough Ennell, Lough Owel, Lough Lene, Lough Sheelin and Lough Ree. Both the Grand Canal, and the Royal Canal flow through Westmeath, and the River Shannon (Ireland's key tourism waterway) has a modern inland harbour in Athlone.

In 2017 the largest employment sectors within Westmeath were:

Two major "Greenway" projects are intended to improve cycling facilities. The Athone - Mullingar section of the Dublin – Galway Greenway, along the old railway corridor between Athlone and Mullingar, was constructed in 2015.
The Royal Canal Greenway takes tourists from the county boundary to Mullingar, and then on towards Longford. Those wishing to use the Dublin-Galway Greenway can transfer from the Royal Canal route to the old rail corridor onwards towards Athlone.

The development of industry in Westmeath has been mainly based on food processing and consumer products. Whiskey is distilled in Kilbeggan and tobacco is processed in Mullingar. The county has an extensive beef and dairy trade. In recent times, the manufacturer Alkermes has located in Athlone. The eastern part of the county is home to commuters, many of whom work at the technology parks on the western side of Dublin.

Mullingar is renowned for the high quality of its beef and veal. Weaned cattle from the west of the Shannon are fattened for market on the lush grasslands of Meath and Westmeath. The cattle are also used to maintain grassland to help sustain wildlife in the areas fringing the Bog of Allen.

Westmeath is home to many stud farms. The plains of Westmeath, covered in calcium-rich marl, contribute significantly to calcification of foal bones during their formative years. Westmeath mares are usually put into foal in spring to facilitate summer growth. Pregnancy lasts for approximately 335–340 days and usually results in one foal. Horses mature when they are around four years old.

Railways
Westmeath also has railway infrastructure with a number of trains passing through towns in the county. The Dublin–Westport/Galway railway line runs through the county, with services from Dublin Heuston to Galway/Westport/Ballina inter-city train service stops at Athlone, while the Dublin-Sligo railway line service stops at Mullingar.  The line from Athlone via Moate railway station to Mullingar could be reopened for trains from Galway to Dublin Connolly. Other major infrastructural projects and plans for the county include Transport 21.

Road transport
Roads are of good quality in the county. As part of the Transport 21 infrastructure programme undertaken by the government, both the N4 and N6 roads have been upgraded to motorway or dual carriageway standard. All towns that these roads passed through are now bypassed, such as Mullingar, Athlone, Moate and Kinnegad. Both Dublin and Galway are within commuting distance from Westmeath following the completion of the M6 motorway in December 2009.
 Midlands (ATM) Gateway
 National Development Plan
 Transport 21

Sport

Westmeath is an active sporting county. The Westmeath GAA senior football team won the Leinster Senior Football Championship, the Delaney Cup, in 2004. They also won the National Football League Division 2 in 2001, 2003 and 2008. The Westmeath senior hurling team has enjoyed much recent success winning the Christy Ring Cup in 2005, 2007 and 2010.

Athlone Town F.C. have won the League of Ireland Championship on two occasions, in 1980 and 1982, and the FAI Cup in 1924.

Westmeath Ladies won the 2011 All-Ireland Intermediate Football Championship.

Athlone Institute of Technology boasts a €10 million international athletics arena, which opened in early 2013. The International Arena has a footprint of 6,818m2 and an overall building floor area of 9,715m2. Some 850 tonnes of structural steel and fifty thousand concrete blocks went into the construction of the facility, which can house two thousand spectators.

Westmeath Snooker Ranking Tournaments officially recognised by The Republic of Ireland Billiards & Snooker Association are organised and run by St Mary's Snooker Club Bishopgate Street Mullingar. The Ranking events in Junior, Intermediate and Senior events are:
Mullingar Open Snooker Championship
Westmeath Open Snooker Championship
St.Mary's Open Classic Snooker Championship
The Midland Open Snooker Championship

People 

Notable Westmeath natives include:

Tony Allen, of music duo Foster & Allen
The Blizzards, music group
Arthur Booth-Clibborn, pioneering Salvation Army officer in France and Switzerland
Cecil Boyd-Rochfort, British thoroughbred racehorse trainer
George Arthur Boyd-Rochfort, awarded Victoria Cross
Emmet Cahill, singer from Irish group Celtic Thunder
Michael Joseph Curley, Archbishop of Washington 
Joe Dolan, singer
Domnall Midi, King of Mide
Thomas Duffy, awarded Victoria Cross
Gormflaith ingen Flann Sinna, Queen of Tara
Laurence Ginnell, Irish nationalist political figure, Irish Party MP and later a Sinn Féin TD in the First Dáil
Robbie Henshaw, Irish Rugby international 
Nuala Holloway, artist and former Miss Ireland
Niall Horan, singer-songwriter and former member of band One Direction
James Lennon, member of the Wisconsin State Assembly
Ray Lynam, singer
Máel Sechnaill II, King of Mide and King of Ireland
John Count McCormack, tenor
John Joe Nevin, boxer
TP O'Connor, journalist, Irish nationalist political figure, British MP
Niall mac Aed Ó hUiginn, poet
Michael O'Leary, CEO of Ryanair
Edward Michael Pakenham, politician and Irish officer in the British army
Peg Plunkett, Dublin brothel keeper
Walter Raleigh, spent time at Killua Castle
Nessa Robins, food writer, blogger and photographer
Brendan Shine, singer
Túathal Techtmar, High King of Ireland
George Wade, British Army Field Marshal

Gallery

See also
 List of abbeys and priories in Ireland (County Westmeath)
 Lord Lieutenant of Westmeath
 High Sheriff of Westmeath

Towns/villages
Athlone
Ballinahown
Ballinalack
Ballykeeran
Ballymore
Ballynacargy
Castledaly
Castlepollard
Castletown-Geoghegan
Clonmellon
Collinstown
Coole
Crookedwood
Delvin
Drumcree
Drumraney
Finnea
Fore
Glassan
Horseleap
Kilbeggan
Killucan and Rathwire
Kinnegad
Milltownpass
Moate
Mount Temple
Moyvoughly
Mullingar, the county town
Multyfarnham
Raharney
Rathconrath
Rathowen
Rochfortbridge
Rosemount
Streamstown
Tang
Tubberclare
Tyrrellspass

References

External links

 Westmeath Census information
 Westmeath Community Development
 STRATEGIC DEVELOPMENT FRAMEWORK FOR THE MIDLANDS GATEWAY; Census statistics page 27 
 Westmeath Enterprise
 Westmeath Examiner (Local Newspaper)
 Westmeath Bands
 Westmeath Architectural Heritage (NIAH) 
 Westmeath Tourism Official Website

 

 
Westmeath
Westmeath
Westmeath